Genivaldo Francisco dos Santos or Geninho (born February 11, 1980) is a Brazilian footballer who last played for Jiangsu Sainty.

Geninho used to play for several football clubs in Brazil such as CSA, Internacional, Criciúma, Sport, Ceilândia, Coruripe, CRB and Novo Hamburgo.

Geninho joined Jiangsu Sainty with an undisclosed fee in July 2009. He did well in season 2009 and the club extended his contract for one years.

References

External links
 at zerozerofootball
 
 Profile at Sohu.com

1980 births
Living people
Brazilian footballers
Brazilian expatriate footballers
Centro Sportivo Alagoano players
Sport Club Internacional players
Criciúma Esporte Clube players
Sport Club do Recife players
Ceilândia Esporte Clube players
Associação Atlética Coruripe players
Clube de Regatas Brasil players
Esporte Clube Novo Hamburgo players
Expatriate footballers in China
Jiangsu F.C. players
Brazilian expatriate sportspeople in China
Chinese Super League players
Association football defenders